Ravenea is a genus of 20 known species of palms, all native to Madagascar and the Comoros.

They are small to large, dioecious palms, with solitary, robust grey stems, swollen at base and gradually tapering upward. The species vary greatly in size, with R.  hildebrandtii and R. nana only reaching 4 m, while R. robustior and R. sambiranensis both reach 30 m. The leaves are up to 2–5 m long, pinnately compound, reduplicate, erect at first then arching, twisted near the apex; with numerous crowded narrow ribbed leaflets. The inflorescence is short, borne among the leaves; the fruit is a red drupe. One particular species, Ravenea rivularis, is commonly cultivated as a houseplant and grown indoors all over the world. However, it is actually considered a vulnerable species in its wild habitat with fewer than 900 trees growing naturally.

Species

Most of the species are endangered. Species such as R. moorei are critically so, with only two specimens known, last seen in 1993 (IUCN report). R. louvelii is little better off, with fewer than 25 plants known (IUCN report). Overall, less than 50 trees of several species are still alive. Historical data indicates that populations are still decreasing for most, except for Ravenea sambiranesis and  Ravenea madagascariensis. The species listed as critically endangered will most likely become extinct this century unless measures are taken to cultivate new trees and protect their habitats from being disrupted by deforestation and water pollution. Even if as few as a dozen trees of each species were planted on ideal, protected land where they could reproduce, it would give each species a much better chance for survival.

Cultivation and uses
Ravenea rivularis (majesty palm) is widely cultivated in subtropical regions, and it is sold commercially as a houseplant. It is an adaptable palm that looks somewhat similar to the ever-popular Queen palm.  It is a very large palm with a large, untidy crown. It has symmetrical leaves and develops an attractive swollen base of the trunk. Majesty palms prefer full sun, plenty of water, and high humidity to ensure healthy growth. It is tolerant of different soil types. Propagation is by seeds, which germinate in 2–3 months.

References

Fairchild Tropical Botanic Garden: Ravenea
RBG Kew: Ravenea
PACSOA: Ravenea

 
Arecaceae genera
Flora of the Western Indian Ocean
Dioecious plants